The 2012 FC Edmonton season was the club's second official season of existence, the club's third season altogether. For the 2012 season, Edmonton played in the North American Soccer League, which serves as the second tier to both the American and Canadian soccer pyramids. Outside of the NASL, Edmonton also participated in the 2012 edition of the Canadian Championship for a berth into the 2012–13 CONCACAF Champions League.

Competitions

Regular season

Standings

Preseason

North American Soccer League regular season

NASL Playoffs

Canadian Championship

Team information

Roster 
As of July 27, 2012.

Staff

Reserve Roster 
The Reserve team played full-time in the Alberta Major Soccer League this season.

Squad statistics

Players
Last updated for match on September 23, 2012.

|}

Disciplinary records
Only players with at least one card included.

Transfers

Recognition

References 

2012
Edmonton
Edmonton